Captain Kenneth Mackenzie, 2nd of Suddie was a Scottish soldier who was killed at the Battle of Mulroy in 1688 whilst commanding Government troops against rebel Scottish clans.

Lineage

He was the son of Alexander Mackenzie, 1st of Suddie and his wife Mary, daughter of Mr Bruce of Airth. He belonged to the Clan Mackenzie.

Career

Kenneth Mackenzie of Suddie served as a Captain in Dumbarton's Regiment in France in 1666, and later as a Royalist in Scotland. He was made commander of an Independent Highland Company raised to help keep order in the Highlands on behalf of the Scottish Government, and in 1685, had received instructions from the Privy Council of Scotland to step-up more aggressive and punitive action against the caterans and broken men. They had been so successful in this task that it was recommended that another Independent Highland Company should be set up to help keep the peace in the south. In 1688, the Privy Council ordered Mackenzie of Suddie and his company to support Mackintosh of Mackintosh in his feud against MacDonald of Keppoch. He was killed fighting against the MacDonalds in the subsequent Battle of Mulroy in August 1688, and his Independent Highland Company suffered very heavy losses.

Family

Kenneth Mackenzie of Suddie had married Isobel, daughter of John Paterson, Bishop of Ross and had the following children:

Kenneth Mackenzie, 3rd of Suddie, heir and successor.
George Mackenzie, who was killed during the failed Darien scheme.
Margaret Mackenzie, who married as his first wife, Colonel Alexander Mackenzie of Conansbay, son of Kenneth Mackenzie, 3rd Earl of Seaforth, chief of Clan Mackenzie.
Alice Mackenzie who married firstly, in 1698, John Macdonald of Balcony, only son of Sir James Macdonald, chief of the Clan Macdonald of Sleat. Alice married secondly, John Maclean who was a medical doctor in Inverness.

Independent Highland Company

See also
Thomas Mackenzie of Pluscarden
Hector Roy Mackenzie

References

Mackenzie, Kenneth
Clan Mackenzie